Vaudreuil-Dorion is a suburb of Greater Montreal, in the Montérégie region of southwestern Quebec, Canada. The result of the merger of two towns, Vaudreuil and Dorion, it is located in the Vaudreuil-Soulanges Regional County Municipality.

History
On 23 November 1702, governor of New France Louis-Hector de Callière gave a seigneury to Philippe de Vaudreuil, who was governor of Montreal at the time. Rigaud de Vaudreuil later became governor of New France.

In 1725, the region had only 38 inhabitants. About 1742 people began to be interested in the region and Vaudreuil's population rose. 381 people lived in Vaudreuil in 1765. With the creation of the Grand Trunk Railway, people began to live in Dorion, which was called Vaudreuil Station. Dorion became a village in 1891.

Dorion was bisected by Autoroute 20 which links Downtown Montreal and Toronto via Highway 401 in Ontario. The Canadian National Railway and Canadian Pacific Railway links between Toronto and Montreal are located in Dorion. Housing developments began in the 1950s and continued well into the 1970s. Throughout the 1980s and the 1990s, housing began sprouting north and east of Dorion.

Vaudreuil and Dorion merged in 1994, becoming the City of Vaudreuil-Dorion.

Geography
Vaudreuil-Dorion is located on the south shores of the Lake of Two Mountains at the confluence of the Saint Lawrence and Ottawa Rivers, just off the western edge of Île Perrot. The city consists of two non-contiguous parts: its eastern part is the larger main area along Lake of Two Mountains where the population centres of Vaudreuil and Dorion are located; the western portion is a smaller rural area that borders Rigaud, and is separated from the eastern portion by Saint-Lazare and Hudson.

Demographics 

Local government

Vaudreuil-Dorion forms part of the federal electoral district of Vaudreuil—Soulanges and has been represented by Peter Schiefke of the Liberal Party since 2015. Provincially, Vaudreuil-Dorion is part of the Vaudreuil electoral district and is represented by Marie-Claude Nichols, an independent MNA, since 2014.

List of former mayors:
 Jean Lemaire (1994–1998)
 Réjean Boyer (1998–2005)
 Guy Pilon (2005–present)

Transportation
The city is the point of intersection for three of Canada's busiest highways: Autoroute 40/Autoroute 30/Autoroute 20 (connecting the Quebec City-Windsor Corridor) and Highway 417 connects to Ottawa and Arnprior, Autoroute 20 and Highway 401 connects Toronto to Montreal and Autoroute 30 is Montreal's Southern Bypass.

Local bus service is operated by Exo La Presqu'Île, connecting to the Vaudreuil and Dorion stations on the Vaudreuil-Hudson commuter rail line.

Media
CJVD-FM operates studios in Vaudreuil-Dorion, broadcasting at 100.1 FM in Vaudreuil-Soulanges, the West Island and Valleyfield. On the air since 2008, CJVD airs a French and English hits format spanning from the 1960s to 1995.

Education
Commission scolaire des Trois-Lacs operates Francophone public schools:
École Brind'Amour Pavillon P
École Sainte-Madeleine
École Saint-Michel
École Harwood (serves sector Dorion-Garden)
École du Papillon-Bleu (pavillon St-Jean-Baptiste and pavillon Sainte-Trinité)
École Hymne-au-Printemps
École Secondaire de la Cité-des-Jeunes

Lester B. Pearson School Board operates Anglophone public schools:
Pierre Elliott Trudeau Elementary School
Other sections are zoned to Mount Pleasant Elementary School in Hudson, St. Patrick Elementary School in Pincourt, and Birchwood Elementary School and Evergreen Elementary School in Saint-Lazare.

Notable people
Christian Chagnon - handball player who competed in the 1976 Summer Olympics
André Hainault - soccer player, Canada and Houston Dynamo
Constant Montpellier - jockey
Norbert Murphy - archer, Paralympic bronze medalist
Hormisdas Pilon - Quebec politician
Sasha Pokulok - ice hockey defenceman
Marc-André Servant - ice dancer
Maxime Deschamps - figure skater

See also
 List of cities in Quebec

References

External links

  Ville de Vaudreuil-Dorion

 
Cities and towns in Quebec
Incorporated places in Vaudreuil-Soulanges Regional County Municipality
Canada geography articles needing translation from French Wikipedia